Kandlein of Regensburg (d. after 1358) was a German–Jewish moneylender.  

She was a prominent businessperson and among the largest taxpayers in Regensburg as a widow. She was also elected one of the appointed leaders of the Regensburg Jewish community, an office she held for at least two years. She was also elected leader of the group that set the taxes for the Jews, and regulated which Jews should be allowed to settle in Regensburg, and how much they should pay for the privilege.

References

Year of birth unknown
Year of death unknown
14th-century German Jews
14th-century German women
14th-century German businesspeople
Medieval bankers
Medieval businesswomen